Sale railway station is located on the Gippsland line in Victoria, Australia. It serves the town of Sale, and it opened on 4 December 1983.

History

The original Sale station opened on 1 June 1877, as the terminus of the line from Morwell, before the line was extended to Stratford Junction on 8 May 1888. This original station was located in the town of Sale itself, east of Reeve Street. It was a dead-end terminus, with the line from Melbourne and the line to Stratford both entering from the west. Trains continuing along the line beyond Sale were required to reverse at the station, or use the Traralgon-Maffra-Stratford line, which avoided Sale altogether. At the peak of operations, the yard had five roads, passenger and goods platforms, a goods shed, a 47-lever signal box, a cattle yard, an engine shed, a coal stage, and a turntable.

There was also a short branch line to the Sale Wharf, as well as a number of industrial sidings in the area, serving cool stores, fuel depots, a gas works, a flour mill, woollen mills, and stockyards.

After many years of discussions between the local council and rail authorities, the station was relocated in 1983, to a site outside the town, on a new section of track which linked the Melbourne and Stratford lines, without the need to run in and out of the original station. This formed a rail triangle for a short period of time. The goods facilities were first to be moved, which occurred on 28 September 1983, using part of the Sale – Stratford line as the base of the yard. The last train ran to the old station on 12 November 1983, with the new station officially opening on 4 December of that year. The last remnant of the railway line arriving directly into Sale was abolished in 1985, when parts of the former Port of Sale spur line were removed. Full signalling was not provided until 1987. Station staff were withdrawn in 1993, but have since been restored.

Rail traffic beyond Sale ceased in December 1995, with Sale becoming the terminus for all trains on the line. Road coach services continued to Stratford, Bairnsdale, Lakes Entrance, Orbost and further east, with some continuing into southern New South Wales. However, in mid-1999, log trains began operating to Bairnsdale again, and the passenger service to Bairnsdale resumed on 3 May 2004.

The original site of Sale station is now the Gippsland Centre Shopping Centre, although the signal box, level crossing gates, and two semaphore signals are statically preserved in situ. To the west of the station, the Sale Industrial Sidings remain in place but unused, as do the goods sidings. The sidings across from the platform were regularly used to allow Bairnsdale to Geelong log trains to cross passenger services, but log trains have ceased running.

Platforms and services

Sale has one platform. It is serviced by V/Line Bairnsdale line services.

Platform 1:
 services to Bairnsdale and Southern Cross

Transport links

Little's Gippsland Coaches operates two routes via Sale station, under contract to Public Transport Victoria:
: to Sale (Gippsland Centre Shopping Centre)
: Sale – Loch Sport

Gallery

References

External links

Victorian Railway Stations Gallery
Melway map

Railway stations in Australia opened in 1877
Regional railway stations in Victoria (Australia)
Sale, Victoria
Transport in Gippsland (region)
Shire of Wellington